Below are lists of public holidays by countries.

Current countries

 Public holidays in Afghanistan
 Public holidays in Albania
 Public holidays in Algeria
 Public holidays in Andorra
 Public holidays in Angola
 Public holidays in Antigua and Barbuda
 Public holidays in Argentina
 Public holidays in Armenia
 Public holidays in Australia
 Public holidays in Christmas Island
 Public holidays in the Cocos (Keeling) Islands
 Public holidays in Norfolk Island
 Public holidays in Austria
 Public holidays in Azerbaijan
 Public holidays in the Bahamas
 Public holidays in Bahrain
 Public holidays in Bangladesh
 Public holidays in Barbados
 Public holidays in Belarus
 Public holidays in Belgium
 Public holidays in Belize
 Public holidays in Benin
 Public holidays in Bermuda
 Public holidays in Bhutan
 Public holidays in Bolivia
 Public holidays in Bosnia and Herzegovina
 Public holidays in Botswana
 Public holidays in Brazil
 Public holidays in Brunei
 Public holidays in Bulgaria
 Public holidays in Burkina Faso
 Public holidays in Burundi
 Public holidays in Cambodia
 Public holidays in Cameroon
 Public holidays in Canada
 Public holidays in Cape Verde
 Public holidays in the Central African Republic
 Public holidays in Chad
 Public holidays in Chile
 Public holidays in China
 Public holidays in Colombia
 Public holidays in the Comoros
 Public holidays in the Democratic Republic of the Congo
 Public holidays in the Republic of the Congo
 Public holidays in Costa Rica
 Public holidays in Ivory Coast
 Public holidays in Croatia
 Public holidays in Cuba
 Public holidays in Cyprus
 Public holidays in the Czech Republic
 Public holidays in Denmark
 Public holidays in the Faroe Islands
 Public holidays in Greenland
 Public holidays in Djibouti
 Public holidays in Dominica
 Public holidays in the Dominican Republic
 Public holidays in East Timor
 Public holidays in Ecuador
 Public holidays in Egypt
 Public holidays in El Salvador
 Public holidays in Equatorial Guinea
 Public holidays in Eritrea
 Public holidays in Estonia
 Public holidays in Eswatini
 Public holidays in Ethiopia
 Public holidays in Fiji
 Public holidays in Finland
 Public holidays in the Åland Islands
 Public holidays in France
 Public holidays in Gabon
 Public holidays in the Gambia
 Public holidays in Georgia
 Public holidays in Abkhazia
 Public holidays in South Ossetia
 Public holidays in Germany
 Public holidays in Ghana
 Public holidays in Greece
 Public holidays in Greenland
 Public holidays in Grenada
 Public holidays in Guatemala
 Public holidays in Guernsey
 Public holidays in Guinea
 Public holidays in Guinea-Bissau
 Public holidays in Guyana
 Public holidays in Haiti
 Public holidays in Honduras
 Public holidays in Hong Kong
 Public holidays in Hungary
 Public holidays in Iceland
 Public holidays in India
 Public holidays in Indonesia
 Public holidays in Iran
 Public holidays in Iraq
 Public holidays in the Republic of Ireland
 Public holidays in the Isle of Man
 Public holidays in Israel
 Public holidays in Italy
 Public holidays in Jamaica
 Public holidays in Japan
 Public holidays in Jersey
 Public holidays in Jordan
 Public holidays in Kazakhstan
 Public holidays in Kenya
 Public holidays in Kiribati
 Public holidays in North Korea
 Public holidays in South Korea
 Public holidays in Kosovo
 Public holidays in Kuwait
 Public holidays in Kyrgyzstan
 Public holidays in Laos
 Public holidays in Latvia
 Public holidays in Lebanon
 Public holidays in Lesotho
 Public holidays in Liberia
 Public holidays in Libya
 Public holidays in Liechtenstein
 Public holidays in Lithuania
 Public holidays in Luxembourg
 Public holidays in Macau
 Public holidays in Madagascar
 Public holidays in Malawi
 Public holidays in Malaysia
 Public holidays in the Maldives
 Public holidays in Mali
 Public holidays in Malta
 Public holidays in the Marshall Islands
 Public holidays in Mauritania
 Public holidays in Mauritius
 Public holidays in Mexico
 Public holidays in the Federated States of Micronesia
 Public holidays in Moldova
 Public holidays in Monaco
 Public holidays in Mongolia
 Public holidays in Montenegro
 Public holidays in Morocco
 Public holidays in Mozambique
 Public holidays in Myanmar
 Public holidays in Namibia
 Public holidays in Nauru
 Public holidays in Nepal
 Public holidays in the Netherlands
 Public holidays in Aruba
 Public holidays in Bonaire
 Public holidays in Curaçao
 Public holidays in Saba
 Public holidays in Sint Eustatius
 Public holidays in Sint Maarten
 Public holidays in New Zealand
 Public holidays in the Cook Islands
 Public holidays in Niue
 Public holidays in Tokelau
 Public holidays in Nicaragua
 Public holidays in Niger
 Public holidays in Nigeria
 Public holidays in North Macedonia
 Public holidays in Norway
 Public holidays in Oman
 Public holidays in Pakistan
 Public holidays in Palau
 Public holidays in Palestine
 Public holidays in Panama
 Public holidays in Papua New Guinea
 Public holidays in Paraguay
 Public holidays in Peru
 Public holidays in the Philippines
 Public holidays in Poland
 Public holidays in Portugal
 Public holidays in Qatar
 Public holidays in Romania
 Public holidays in Russia
 Public holidays in Rwanda
 Public holidays in Saint Kitts and Nevis
 Public holidays in Saint Lucia
 Public holidays in Saint Vincent and the Grenadines
 Public holidays in Samoa
 Public holidays in San Marino
 Public holidays in São Tomé and Príncipe
 Public holidays in Saudi Arabia
 Public holidays in Senegal
 Public holidays in Serbia
 Public holidays in Seychelles
 Public holidays in Sierra Leone
 Public holidays in Singapore
 Public holidays in Slovakia
 Public holidays in Slovenia
 Public holidays in Solomon Islands
 Public holidays in Somalia
 Public holidays in Somaliland
 Public holidays in South Africa
 Public holidays in South Sudan
 Public holidays in Spain
 Public holidays in Sri Lanka
 Public holidays in Sudan
 Public holidays in Suriname
 Public holidays in Sweden
 Public holidays in Switzerland
 Public holidays in Syria
 Public holidays in Taiwan
 Public holidays in Tajikistan
 Public holidays in Tanzania
 Public holidays in Thailand
 Public holidays in Togo
 Public holidays in Tonga
 Public holidays in Transnistria
 Public holidays in Trinidad and Tobago
 Public holidays in Tunisia
 Public holidays in Turkey
 Public holidays in Northern Cyprus
 Public holidays in Turkmenistan
 Public holidays in Tuvalu
 Public holidays in Uganda
 Public holidays in Ukraine
 Public holidays in the United Arab Emirates
 Public holidays in the United Kingdom
 Public holidays in Anguilla
 Public holidays in the British Virgin Islands
 Public holidays in the Cayman Islands
 Public holidays in Gibraltar
 Public holidays in the Falkland Islands
 Public holidays in Saint Helena, Ascension and Tristan da Cunha
 Public holidays in the Turks and Caicos Islands
 Public holidays in the United States
 Public holidays in Guam
 Public holidays in Puerto Rico
 Public holidays in the United States Virgin Islands
 Public holidays in Uruguay
 Public holidays in Uzbekistan
 Public holidays in Vanuatu
 Public holidays in Vatican City
 Public holidays in Venezuela
 Public holidays in Vietnam
 Public holidays in Yemen
 Public holidays in Zambia
 Public holidays in Zimbabwe

Former countries
 Public holidays in Rhodesia
 Public holidays in the Soviet Union

See also
 Public holidays in the European Union
 List of multinational festivals and holidays
 Lists of festivals
 List of countries by number of public holidays
 List of minimum annual leave by country

References

External links
 
 Worldwide Public Holidays & Observances

Lists of days